Natia Todua (born 12 March 1996) is a Georgian-German singer. She came to prominence in Germany after winning the seventh season of The Voice of Germany. In 2018, Todua became a judge on the Georgian version of Idol.

Life and career

2014–2016: Early life and Georgian career
Todua was born in Tbilisi on 12 March 1996 to parents who fled Abkhazia during the War in Abkhazia of the early-1990s. When she was two years old, her family returned to Abkhazia and settled in Gali District. After completing school, she and her sister returned to Tbilisi, where Todua studied economics at Caucasus University. She went on to take part in X Factor Georgia in 2014 and X-Factor Ukraine in 2015, but did not achieve success in the competitions.

2017–present: The Voice of Germany and Unser Lied für Lissabon
In 2016, Todua moved to Germany where she began working as an au pair, living in Bruchsal. The following year, she auditioned for the seventh season of The Voice of Germany, and joined the team of Samu Haber. Todua progressed through the competition, and ultimately was chosen as the winner by the German public on 17 December 2017. Following her win, she was signed to Universal Music Group. On 29 December 2017, Todua was confirmed as a contestant in Unser Lied für Lissabon, the German national selection for the Eurovision Song Contest 2018. Her entry "My Own Way" was released on 20 February 2018, which went on to place last in the competition.

In 2018, Todua became a judge on the Georgian version of Idol.

Discography

Singles

References

External links 

1996 births
English-language singers from Georgia (country)
21st-century women singers from Georgia (country)
Expatriates from Georgia (country) in Germany
Living people
People from Gali District, Abkhazia
Musicians from Tbilisi
Pop singers from Georgia (country)
The Voice (franchise) winners
Winner07
The X Factor contestants
Universal Music Group artists